Waterloo Road railway station was built by the North Staffordshire Railway as part of on the Potteries Loop Line and served the north of the town of Hanley, Staffordshire.  The station opened in 1900 and closed to passengers in 1943. General goods traffic remained until 1966 with oil traffic continuing until 1969

No trace of the station remains today, the station was at the road crossing on Waterloo Road between Hanley and Cobridge.

References

External links
 Waterloo Road page on Potteries.org.

Disused railway stations in Stoke-on-Trent
Railway stations in Great Britain closed in 1943
Railway stations in Great Britain opened in 1900
Former North Staffordshire Railway stations
1900 establishments in England
1943 disestablishments in England